Prisons in Albania are divided into three levels: closed, semi-open, and open. A difference is made between ordinary closed prisons and high security prisons. Most Albanian prisons have separate blocks (wings) for women and children (juveniles), while others keep women and children together.

As in other countries, prisoners in Albania are separated into remanded prisoners (in pre-trial detention) and convicted prisoners (whose sentences are being executed).  Prisons in Albania are managed by the General Directorate of Prisons. The country has 22 prisons, 1 prison hospital, and 1 juvenile institute, which have a total capacity of 6,284 inmates.

Prisons

References